Antonín Jelínek (born 4 November 1956) is a Czech wrestler. He competed in the men's Greco-Roman 52 kg at the 1980 Summer Olympics.

References

1956 births
Living people
Czech male sport wrestlers
Olympic wrestlers of Czechoslovakia
Wrestlers at the 1980 Summer Olympics
Sportspeople from Chomutov